Dumar Kachhar is a census town in Shahdol district  in the state of Madhya Pradesh, India.

Demographics
 India census, Dumar Kachhar had a population of 9730. Males constitute 54% of the population and females 46%. Dumar Kachhar has an average literacy rate of 67%, higher than the national average of 59.5%: male literacy is 76% and, female literacy is 57%. In Dumar Kachhar, 13% of the population is under 6 years of age.

References

Cities and towns in Shahdol district
Shahdol